Villar Dora is a comune (municipality) in the Metropolitan City of Turin in the Italian region Piedmont, located about 25 km west of Turin.

Villar Dora borders the following municipalities: Rubiana, Caprie, Almese, Sant'Ambrogio di Torino, and Avigliana.

Twin towns — sister cities
Villar Dora is twinned with:

  Lanslebourg-Mont-Cenis, France

References

External links
 www.comune.villardora.to.it/

Cities and towns in Piedmont